The 22nd People's Choice Awards, honoring the best in popular culture for 1995, were held on March 10, 1996, at Universal Studios Hollywood, in Universal City, California. They were hosted by Brett Butler, and broadcast on CBS.

Michael Douglas received a special award for his work in the motion picture industry.

Awards
Winners are listed first, in bold.

References

External links
1996 People's Choice.com

People's Choice Awards
1996 awards in the United States
1996 in California
March 1996 events in the United States